Saywa Q'asa (Quechua saywa boundary stone, landmark, q'asa mountain pass, "landmark mountain pass", Hispanicized spelling Sayhuaccasa) is a mountain in the Andes of Peru, about  high. It is situated in the Ayacucho Region, Cangallo Province, in the north of the Paras District. Saywa Q'asa lies south-west of the mountain Chiqllarasu, west of the mountain Saywa (Sayhua), north-east of the mountain Waranwallqa and east of the mountain Rit'ipata.

The Pampawasi River (Pampahuasi) originates near Saywa Q'asa. It flows to the south where its waters reach Pampas River near the town of Paras.

References

Mountains of Peru
Mountains of Ayacucho Region